The 1960 Ibero-American Games (Spanish: I Juegos Iberoamericanos) were held at the Estadio Nacional in Santiago, Chile, between October 11–16, 1960.

A total of 31 events were contested, 22 by men and 9 by women.

Medal summary
Medal winners were published.

Men

Women

Medal table (unofficial)
Medal tables for both male and female competitions were published.

Team trophies
The placing table for team trophy awarded to the 1st place overall team (men and women) was published.

Overall

Participation
A total number of 325 athletes (278 men and 47 women) from 15 countries was reported to participate in the event.

References

1960
1960 in athletics (track and field)
1960 in Chilean sport
International athletics competitions hosted by Chile
October 1960 sports events in South America